Ivanoff (feminine: Ivanoffa) is a surname. People with the surname include:

Serge Ivanoff (1893–1983), Russian painter
Victor Ivanoff (1909–1990), Russian-born South African painter and cartoonist
Juan Carlos Bacileff Ivanoff (born 1949), Argentine politician
Nicolas Ivanoff (born 1969), French pilot and flying instructor
Alexandre Barbera-Ivanoff (born 1973), French painter
Jonathan Ivanoff (born 1989), Argentine footballer
Eugene Nicolaievich Ivanoff, imposter to the Romanov family
Nick Ivanoff, American transportation businessman

See also
Ivanoff Head, a small rocky headland, Vincennes Bay, Antarctica
Ivanov (disambiguation)

Russian-language surnames
Bulgarian-language surnames
Surnames of Russian origin
Jewish surnames
Macedonian-language surnames
Surnames from given names